Nihonhimea is a genus of spiders in the family Theridiidae. It was first described in 2016 by Yoshida. , it contains 4 species.

References

Theridiidae
Araneomorphae genera
Spiders of Africa
Spiders of Asia
Spiders of Mexico
Spiders of Central America
Spiders of South America